Marc Anthony Magro (born August 23, 1984) is a former American football linebacker. He was signed by the St. Louis Rams as an undrafted free agent in 2008. He played college football at West Virginia.

Magro has also been a member of the Miami Dolphins, Tampa Bay Buccaneers, and New York Sentinels.

Early years
As a senior at University High School, Magro earned All-State honors as he helped lead his team to a 9-3 record and the second round of the West Virginia playoffs. He recorded 154 tackles, 28 for a loss, and five sacks in his career. He was also a baseball letterman.

College career
Magro enrolled at West Virginia University in 2003 and redshirted during the season.

In 2004, his redshirt-freshman season, Magro saw time on every special teams unit. He recorded 32 tackles on the season, including a team-high 10 tackles in the win over James Madison. He also had six tackles against UConn and four against Boston College.

In 2005, Magro played backup linebacker to Jay Henry. He recorded 41 tackles as a three-year sophomore, beginning with three in the Wofford victory. As Henry was injured in the game against East Carolina, Magro made nine tackles, two sacks, and forced two fumbles. Against Virginia Tech, Magro had 8 tackles and a tackle for a loss. He had a key seven-yard sack in the victory over UConn and in the 2006 Sugar Bowl, he had two tackles and recovered a fumble against the Georgia. He earned the Ideal Mountaineer Man Award at the end of the season from head coach Rich Rodriguez.

In 2006, Magro saw moderate starting time at middle linebacker. He played alongside senior Boo McLee at outside linebacker. To start the season, Magro recorded six tackles and a tackle for a loss in the Friends of Coal Bowl against Marshall. He also had a team-best five tackles against Eastern Washington. In the Maryland victory, Magro had six tackles and three pass break-ups. In the victory over UConn, Magro had four tackles and a tackle for a loss. He suffered a stinger against South Florida, but still recorded three tackles in the loss. Magro earned the Gridiron Gladiator Award from head coach Rich Rodriguez at the end of the season and the 2006 Iron Mountaineer Award for his performance in the winter workout program.

Magro earned the starting job in 2007 at middle linebacker, playing alongside Mortty Ivy and Reed Williams. Magro, along with Eric Wicks was named to the Lott Trophy watch list. In his final collegiate game, the 2008 Fiesta Bowl win over Oklahoma, he recorded four tackles. He finished the season with 64 tackles, three sacks, two forced fumbles, and a fumble recovery.

Magro earned second-team all-Big East honors and was selected by the National Football Foundation and College Football Hall of Fame's Hampshire Honor Society as a scholar-athlete after the 2007 season. He, along with Pat White, and Johnny Dingle, was named an Honorable Mention All-American by Sports Illustrated.com.

Professional career

Pre-draft
Magro worked out at West Virginia's Pro Day on March 13, 2008. His 28 bench reps was one of the top for any prospect for the 2008 NFL Draft on their respective Pro Day workout.

St. Louis Rams
Magro went undrafted in the 2008 NFL Draft. Then on May 5, he signed with the St. Louis Rams. In his first preseason game as a Ram, he was third on the team with five tackles against the Tennessee Titans. He was released on August 30 but was re-signed to the team's practice squad following the preseason. He was released from the practice squad on September 24 when wide receiver Matt Caddell was re-signed.

Miami Dolphins
Magro was signed to the practice squad of the Miami Dolphins on October 6, 2008. The team released linebacker Tyson Smith to make room for Magro on the practice squad. Magro was released on October 14 and replaced by linebacker William Kershaw.

Tampa Bay Buccaneers
Magro was signed to the practice squad of the Tampa Bay Buccaneers on November 12, 2008. He replaced wide receiver Brian Clark, who was promoted to the active roster. Magro was released on December 3, 2008.

New York Sentinels
Magro was drafted by the New York Sentinels of the United Football League in the UFL Premiere Season Draft. He signed with the team on August 5, 2009.

References

External links
West Virginia Mountaineers bio

1984 births
American football linebackers
Living people
Miami Dolphins players
New York Sentinels players
Sportspeople from Morgantown, West Virginia
Players of American football from West Virginia
St. Louis Rams players
Tampa Bay Buccaneers players
University High School (Morgantown, West Virginia) alumni
West Virginia Mountaineers football players